Luskin's Bridge is situated  north-east of Coachford village, County Cork, Ireland,  south-east of Aghabullogue village, and is depicted on both the 1841 and 1901 surveyed OS maps. It is located at the meeting point of Clonmoyle East townland (which lies within the civil parish and Catholic parish of Aghabullogue) with Kilcolman and Knockanenagark townlands (which both lie within the civil parish of Magourney and Catholic parish of Aghabullogue).

In the Ordnance Survey name book (c. 1840), it is named 'Lurkan's Bridge', described as having three arches and on the road from Macroom to Mallow, with a man named Lurkan said to have previously lived in proximity to it.

The National Inventory of Architectural Heritage describes it as a double-arched bridge, built c. 1800, and spanning the Dripsey River. A single-span feeder arch is located on the western side. It also has rubble stone v-cutwaters on its north and south elevations, and rubble stone parapet walls with concrete capping. An upstream weir and additional arch were likely built to accommodate a mill race feeding Clonmoyle Mill to the south. The weir and mill race are both depicted on the 1901 surveyed OS Map.

Many surviving bridges in mid-Cork are originally constructed of stone, arched in shape, and late eighteenth or early nineteenth century in date. Typical features include semi-circular arches and pointed breakwaters. Earlier bridges are often narrower, although some were widened at a later stage.

See also
Clonmoyle East (townland)
Clonmoyle House
Clonmoyle Mill
Leader's Aqueduct
Cottage House, Clonmoyle
Athnanangle Bridge

References

External links
 1841 surveyed OS map (maps.osi.ie)
 1901 surveyed OS map (maps.osi.ie)
 acrheritage.info

Bridges in County Cork